The Erlasee Solar Park, or Solarstrompark Gut Erlasee, is an 11.4 megawatt (MW) photovoltaic power station located in Bavaria, southern Germany, in one of the sunniest regions of the country. Constructed on a former vineyard by the company Solon SE in 2006, it was then the world's largest photovoltaic power station.

The project uses 1,464 double-axis solar trackers to increase the annual electricity yield by 30 percent. Each tracker shoulders twelve conventional solar panels made of crystalline silicon. The plant generates about 14,000 megawatt-hours (MWh) annually, or as much as the average consumption of the nearby town of Arnstein.

The plant cost €70 million and covers an area of 77 hectares (190 acres). The project was officially commissioned on 1 September 2006. The inauguration party included a concert given by the popular German rock bands BAP and The BossHoss.

See also

Solar power in Germany
List of photovoltaic power stations

References

External links
SunPower Celebrates the Dedication of SOLON's Gut Erlasee Solar Park

Photovoltaic power stations in Germany
Economy of Bavaria
Main-Spessart